Anwar Hossain (1938 – 17 August 2021) was an entrepreneur, industrialist and politician of Bangladesh who was a Member of Parliament for Dhaka-8 constituency. He was the founder and chairman of Anwar Group.

Birth and early life 
Anwar Hossain was born in 1938 in Dhaka Almigola (Lalbagh). He started living in Dhanmondi in 1973. His father was Rahim Box and mother was Jamila Khatun. His grandfather was Lakku Mia. His wife was Bibi Amena and Dr Hamida Banu Shova. He has five daughters and three sons. Daughters: Shaheen Begum, Selina Begum Mala, Hasina Begum Ruma, Shahnaz Begum Munni and Jamila Hossain. Sons: Manwar Hossain, Hossain Mehmud and Hossain Khaled.

Career 
Anwar Hossain, the head of Anwar Group, was started in 1834 by his grandfather Lakku Mia (real name Lat Mia). He started his business in 1953. Anwar established Silk Mills in 1968 and brought Mala Sari to the market. There are 20 companies under the group, which is involved in 36 products and services, including textiles, jute, cement, steel, banking, insurance, automobiles, housing, infrastructure and furniture. He was one of the founders of The City Bank, which was established in 1983. He was the chairman of The City Bank for four terms.

He was elected a Member of Parliament from Dhaka-8 constituency as a Jatiya Party constituency as an independent candidate in the fourth parliamentary elections of 1988 Bangladeshi general election.

Death 
On 17 August 2021, Anwar Hossain died at LABAID Hospital in Dhaka due to old-age complications.

References 

1938 births
2021 deaths
People from Dhaka
Jatiya Party (Ershad) politicians
4th Jatiya Sangsad members